A Prairie Home Album is an album from the Prairie Home Companion radio show.  It features items written for the early days of the program, when it was a morning show broadcast from KSJN in St. Paul, MN.

Track listing 

Side One

Six A.M. [4:55]
O Father Dear Why (Gagne) [2:55]
That Sound Friends [3:45]
Old Shep (Foley) [3:20]
When I Was a Boy [3:33]
Mom Angel (Keillor/Raygor) [2:45]

Side Two

Breakfast Hymn (Will L. Thompson, 1879) [2:58]
Joy to the World & Time for a Word [3:00]
My Mailbox Is Empty (Gagne) [3:50]
The Timber Wolf (Gagne/Hinkley) [4:55]
Hobo's Meditation (Rodgers) [2:40]
On the Road (Keillor) [5:20]

Personnel
 Garrison Keillor: Vocal
 Bill Hinkley: guitar and vocal harmony and fiddle ("Joy to the World")
 Judy Larson: guitar ("O Father Dear Why" and " Joy to the World") and vocal harmony
 Stephen Gammell: guitar and vcal ("Old Shep" and "Hobo's Meditation")
 Jon Pankake: fiddle ("The Timber Wolf")
 Tom Ardnt, Larry P. Gagne, Slim Graves: vocal harmony ("Mom Angel")

Production
 "That Sound Friends" recorded at Walker Art Center, Minneapolis
 "Old Shep", "Hobo's Meditation" and  "Time for a Word" recorded at St. Paul Arts & Science Center
 "Breakfast Hymn" recorded at Henry Schoolcraft State Park on the Upper Mississippi River
 All others recorded at the studios of KSJN
 Album cover: Barbara and Patrick Redmond
 Technical direction by David Carlton Felland
 Engineering assistance from D. Michael Shields, Jerry Vanek, and David Rassmussen

Garrison Keillor albums
1979 compilation albums
Radio program compilation albums